Chris Nahon is a French film director best known for directing the films Kiss of the Dragon, Empire of the Wolves, and Blood: The Last Vampire.

Filmography

External links
 

1968 births
Living people
People from Soisy-sous-Montmorency
French film directors